This is a list of rivers and significant streams in the U.S. state of New Hampshire.

New Hampshire rivers and streams qualify for state shoreland protection (and are listed here in bold) if they are fourth-order or larger water bodies, based on the Strahler method of stream order classification.

By drainage basin
All New Hampshire rivers ultimately flow to the Atlantic Ocean.  The list is sorted by major drainage basin, running from north to south along the Atlantic coast, with respective tributaries arranged based on their entry into the main stream from mouth to source. Where several tributaries enter a single lake, they are listed running clockwise from the lake outlet.

Androscoggin River

Androscoggin River
Wild River
Rattle River
Peabody River
West Branch Peabody River
Moose River
Moose Brook
Dead River
Chickwolnepy Stream
Mollidgewock Brook
Clear Stream
Magalloway River
Dead Diamond River
Swift Diamond River
Little Dead Diamond River
South Branch Little Dead Diamond River
West Branch Little Dead Diamond River
West Branch Dead Diamond River
Middle Branch Dead Diamond River
East Branch Dead Diamond River
Little Magalloway River
Middle Branch Little Magalloway River
West Branch Little Magalloway River
West Branch Magalloway River

Saco River

Saco River
Ossipee River
South River
Ossipee Lake
Pine River
Beech River
Dan Hole River
Lovell River
Bearcamp River
Chocorua River
Swift River (Bearcamp River tributary)
Mill Brook
Wonalancet River
Cold River (Bearcamp River tributary)
Whiteface River
East Branch Whiteface River
West Branch
Deer River
Shepards River
Cold River (Maine – New Hampshire)
Little Cold River
Mad River
South Branch Mad River
Middle Branch Mad River
Swift River (Saco River tributary)
Pequawket Brook
East Branch Saco River
East Fork East Branch Saco River
Ellis River
Wildcat Brook
New River
Cutler River
Rocky Branch
Sawyer River
Dry River

Piscataqua River and New Hampshire Atlantic coast

Piscataqua River (tidal)
Great Bay (tidal)
Bellamy River
Oyster River
Bunker Creek
Winnicut River
Squamscott River (tidal)
Exeter River
Little River (Exeter, New Hampshire)
Little River (Brentwood, New Hampshire)
Lamprey River
Piscassic River
Fresh River
Little River (Lamprey River tributary)
North River
Bean River
Pawtuckaway River
North Branch River
Cocheco River
Isinglass River
Berrys River
Rattlesnake River
Mad River
Ela River
Salmon Falls River
Branch River
Jones Brook

Little River

Hampton River (tidal)
Blackwater River (tidal)
Browns River
Hampton Falls River
Taylor River
Drakes River
Old River

Merrimack River

Merrimack River
Powwow River
Back River
Little River
Spicket River
Beaver Brook
Salmon Brook
Nashua River
Nissitissit River
Souhegan River
Baboosic Brook
Purgatory Brook
Stony Brook
South Branch Souhegan River
West Branch Souhegan River
Cohas Brook
Sucker Brook
Little Massabesic Brook
Piscataquog River
South Branch Piscataquog River
Middle Branch Piscataquog River
Black Brook
Suncook River
Bear Brook
Little Suncook River
Big River
Little River
Soucook River
Turkey River
Contoocook River
Blackwater River
Frazier Brook
Warner River
Lane River
West Branch Warner River
North Branch Contoocook River
Beards Brook
Shedd Brook
Nubanusit Brook
Gridley River
Pemigewasset River
Smith River
Newfound River
Newfound Lake
Fowler River
Cockermouth River
Squam River
Baker River
South Branch Baker River
East Branch Baker River
Beebe River
Mad River
West Branch Mad River
Moosilauke Brook
Lost River
East Branch Pemigewasset River
North Fork East Branch Pemigewasset River
Winnipesaukee River
Tioga River
Lake Winnipesaukee
Red Hill River
Melvin River
Merrymeeting River
Gunstock River

Connecticut River

Connecticut River
Millers River
Tarbell Brook
North Branch Millers River
Ashuelot River
Mirey Brook
South Branch Ashuelot River
The Branch
Otter Brook
Partridge Brook
Cold River
Great Brook
Little Sugar River
Sugar River
North Branch Sugar River
Stocker Brook
South Branch Sugar River
Blow-me-down Brook
Mascoma River
Knox River
Indian River
Mink Brook
Oliverian Brook
Ammonoosuc River
Wild Ammonoosuc River
Gale River
Ham Branch
North Branch Gale River
South Branch Gale River
Little River
Zealand River
Johns River
Israel River
South Branch Israel River
Upper Ammonoosuc River
Nash Stream
Phillips Brook
North Branch Upper Ammonoosuc River
West Branch Upper Ammonoosuc River
Simms Stream
Mohawk River
East Branch Mohawk River
West Branch Mohawk River
Halls Stream
Indian Stream
Perry Stream

Alphabetically

Ammonoosuc River
Androscoggin River
Ashuelot River
Baboosic Brook
Back River
Baker River
Bean River
Bear Brook
Bearcamp River
Beards Brook
Beaver Brook
Beebe River
Beech River
Bellamy River
Berrys River
Big River
Black Brook
Blackwater River (Contoocook River tributary)
Blackwater River (Massachusetts-New Hampshire)
Blow-me-down Brook
Branch River
Browns River
Bunker Creek
Chickwolnepy Stream
Clear Stream
Chocorua River
Cocheco River
Cockermouth River
Cohas Brook
Cold River (Bearcamp River tributary)
Cold River (Connecticut River tributary)
Cold River (Maine – New Hampshire)
Connecticut River
Contoocook River
Cutler River
Dan Hole River
Dead River
Dead Diamond River
Deer River
Drakes River
Dry River
East Branch Baker River
East Branch Dead Diamond River
East Branch Mohawk River
East Branch Pemigewasset River
East Branch Saco River
East Branch Whiteface River
East Fork East Branch Saco River
Ela River
Ellis River
Exeter River
Fowler River
Frazier Brook
Fresh River
Gale River
Great Brook
Gridley River
Gunstock River
Halls Stream
Ham Branch
Hampton River
Hampton Falls River
Indian River
Indian Stream
Isinglass River
Israel River
Johns River
Jones Brook
Knox River
Lamprey River
Lane River
Little River (Ammonoosuc River tributary)
Little River (Big River tributary)
Little River (Brentwood, New Hampshire)
Little River (Exeter, New Hampshire)
Little River (Lamprey River tributary)
Little River (Merrimack River tributary)
Little River (New Hampshire Atlantic coast)
Little Cold River
Little Dead Diamond River
Little Magalloway River
Little Massabesic Brook
Little Sugar River
Little Suncook River
Lost River
Lovell River
Mad River (Cocheco River tributary)
Mad River (Cold River tributary)
Mad River (Pemigewasset River tributary)
Magalloway River
Mascoma River
Melvin River
Merrimack River
Merrymeeting River
Middle Branch Dead Diamond River
Middle Branch Little Magalloway River
Middle Branch Mad River
Middle Branch Piscataquog River
Mill Brook
Mink Brook
Mirey Brook
Mohawk River
Mollidgewock Brook
Moose Brook
Moose River
Moosilauke Brook
Nash Stream
Nashua River
New River
Newfound River
Nissitissit River
North River
North Branch River
North Branch Contoocook River
North Branch Gale River
North Branch Millers River
North Branch Sugar River
North Branch Upper Ammonoosuc River
North Fork East Branch Pemigewasset River
Nubanusit Brook
Old River
Oliverian Brook
Ossipee River
Otter Brook
Oyster River
Partridge Brook
Pawtuckaway River
Peabody River
Pemigewasset River
Pequawket Brook
Perry Stream
Phillips Brook
Pine River
Piscassic River
Piscataqua River
Piscataquog River
Powwow River
Purgatory Brook
Rattle River
Rattlesnake River
Red Hill River
Rocky Branch
Saco River
Salmon Brook
Salmon Falls River
Sawyer River
Shedd Brook
Shepards River
Simms Stream
Smith River
Soucook River
Souhegan River
South River
South Branch Ashuelot River
South Branch Baker River
South Branch Gale River
South Branch Israel River
South Branch Little Dead Diamond River
South Branch Mad River
South Branch Piscataquog River
South Branch Souhegan River
South Branch Sugar River
Spicket River
Squam River
Squamscott River
Stocker Brook
Stony Brook
Sucker Brook
Sugar River
Suncook River
Swift River (Bearcamp River tributary)
Swift River (Saco River tributary)
Swift Diamond River
Tarbell Brook
Taylor River
The Branch
Tioga River
Turkey River
Upper Ammonoosuc River
Warner River
West Branch (New Hampshire)
West Branch Dead Diamond River
West Branch Little Dead Diamond River
West Branch Little Magalloway River
West Branch Mad River
West Branch Magalloway River
West Branch Mohawk River
West Branch Peabody River
West Branch Souhegan River
West Branch Upper Ammonoosuc River
West Branch Warner River
Whiteface River
Wild River
Wild Ammonoosuc River
Wildcat Brook
Winnicut River
Winnipesaukee River
Wonalancet River
Zealand River

See also
Outline of New Hampshire
List of National Wild and Scenic Rivers in New Hampshire
List of rivers of the United States

References

External links
 New Hampshire streamflow data from the USGS
  New Hampshire watersheds from the EPA

 
Rivers
New Hampshire